Jacob Shallus or Shalus (1750–April 18, 1796) was the engrosser or penman of the original copy of the United States Constitution. The handwritten document that Shallus engrossed is on display at the National Archives Building in Washington.

Early life 
Shallus was the son of German immigrants, Valentine Schallus and Frederica Catherina.  His brother Thomas Shallus was a mapmaker. He was born a year after his father Valentine immigrated to Pennsylvania and was a volunteer in the Revolutionary War. During the war Shallus fought in Canada and became a quartermaster of Pennsylvania's 1st Battalion. Shallus also assisted in the outfitting of a privateering vessel, the Retrieve.

Career 
At the time of the Constitutional Convention in Philadelphia, Shallus served as Assistant Clerk to the Pennsylvania General Assembly, which met at the Pennsylvania State House (today known as Independence Hall). The convention's desire for speedy drafting and Shallus' convenience to the convention's meeting may have influenced his choice as engrosser.

Shallus' name appears nowhere on the document itself, but an investigation into the identity of the Penman in 1937 for the 150th anniversary of the Constitution revealed the identity of the transcriber. Shallus was paid $30 for his engrossing work, a sum recorded as for "clerks employed to transcribe & engross." The effort consisted of copying the Constitution on four sheets of parchment made from treated animal skin (either calf, goat, or sheep; in 1987 the supervising conservator at the National Archives said, "We don't know which") and measuring 28 3/4 inches by 23 5/8 inches, probably with a goose quill and with ink made of iron filings in oak gall that was black when applied but that has now turned brownish. Shallus engrossed the entire document except for the list of states at the end of the document, which are in Alexander Hamilton's handwriting.

Shallus is also credited as Assistant Secretary in the 1790 re-authoring of the State Constitution of Pennsylvania.

Personal life 
Shallus married Elizabeth Melchor, sister to Col. Isaac Melcher, Barrack-Master-General of the Revolutionary Army. Her obituary from the Democratic Press (Pennsylvania), Aug. 3, 1818, p. 3 notes that she was "one of those patriotic Ladies of Philadelphia who first associated together and supplied the suffering soldiers with shirts, stockings, &c. in that eventful period of the revolution, which tried and apalled [sic] even men's souls."

See also
History of the United States Constitution

References

External links
 Prologue Winter 2002, Vol. 34, No. 4, Travels of the Charters of Freedom
Historical Background National Park Service Document
History of Penmanship

1750 births
1796 deaths
American calligraphers
People from Philadelphia
Drafting of the United States Constitution
People of colonial Pennsylvania
American people of German descent
People of Pennsylvania in the American Revolution